Ingrid Imelda Wolff (born February 17, 1964 in The Hague, South Holland) is a former Dutch field hockey forward, who won the bronze medal with the National Women's Team at the 1988 Summer Olympics. 

Four years later in Barcelona she finished in sixth position with the national side. From 1985 to 1992 she played a total number of 107 international matches for Holland, in which she scored 33 goals. A player from HDM in The Hague, she retired after the 1992 Summer Olympics.

External links
 
 Dutch Hockey Federation

1964 births
Living people
Dutch female field hockey players
Olympic field hockey players of the Netherlands
Field hockey players at the 1988 Summer Olympics
Field hockey players at the 1992 Summer Olympics
Field hockey players from The Hague
Olympic medalists in field hockey

Medalists at the 1988 Summer Olympics
Olympic bronze medalists for the Netherlands